W. Lawson Butt (4 March 1880 – 14 January 1956) was a British actor and film director of the silent era.

Selected filmography
Actor
 The Woman Next Door (1915)
 Romeo and Juliet (1916)
 The Danger Trail (1917)
 Shackled (1918)
 Playthings of Passion (1919)
 Desert Gold (1919)
 It Happened in Paris (1919)
 The Miracle Man (1919) (*uncredited though substantial part in film)
 The World and Its Woman (1919)
 The Loves of Letty (1919)
 Earthbound (1920)
 The Tiger's Coat (1920)
 The Sting of the Lash (1921)
 Beyond the Crossroads (1922)
 The Masquerader (1922)
 The Flying Dutchman (1923)
 Dante's Inferno (1924)
 The Chicago Fire (1925)
 The Beloved Rogue (1927)
 Old San Francisco (1927)
 The Ringer (1928)

Director
 Afterwards (1928)

References

External links

1880 births
1956 deaths
Male actors from Bristol
English film directors
English male silent film actors
20th-century English male actors
Film people from Bristol